The 1980 United Nations Security Council election was held from 20 October to 13 November 1980 during the Thirty-seventh session of the United Nations General Assembly, held at United Nations Headquarters in New York City. The General Assembly elected Ireland, Japan, Panama, Spain, and Uganda, as the five new non-permanent members of the UN Security Council for two-year mandates commencing on 1 January 1981.

Rules

The Security Council has 15 seats, filled by five permanent members and ten non-permanent members. Each year, half of the non-permanent members are elected for two-year terms. A sitting member may not immediately run for re-election.

In accordance with the rules whereby the ten non-permanent UNSC seats rotate among the various regional blocs into which UN member states traditionally divide themselves for voting and representation purposes, the five available seats are allocated as follows:

One for African countries (held by Zambia)
One for countries from the Asian Group (now called the Asia-Pacific Group) (held by Bangladesh)
One for Latin America and the Caribbean (held by Jamaica)
Two for the Western European and Others Group (held by Norway and Portugal)

To be elected, a candidate must receive a two-thirds majority of those present and voting. If the vote is inconclusive after the first round, three rounds of restricted voting shall take place, followed by three rounds of unrestricted voting, and so on, until a result has been obtained. In restricted voting, only official candidates may be voted on, while in unrestricted voting, any member of the given regional group, with the exception of current Council members, may be voted on.

Candidates

Africa and Asia

Western Europe and Others
The candidates for the Western European and Others Group were announced by its chairman, the delegate for New Zealand, prior to the first round of voting.

Latin America and the Caribbean
 – Costa Rica was one of only two countries to declare its intention to seek the one Latin American seat prior to the election. It formally withdrew after the twenty-second round.
 – Cuba was the other country that declared its candidacy prior to the election. However, before the first round of voting, Cuba withdrew, citing conditions similar to the previous year's election, in which Cuba had been an unsuccessful candidate and which had lasted 155 rounds over three months.
 – Panama only declared its candidacy after fourteen rounds of inconclusive voting were already complete, having initially endorsed Costa Rica, citing the election of Ronald Reagan as a compelling reason for Panama's presence on the Council.

Non-candidates
 – Having received a significant number of votes in the first few rounds, Guyana clarified that it was not a seeking a seat on the Council and formally endorsed Costa Rica.
 – Although receiving a significant number of votes in the middle rounds, the Nicaraguan government decided not to be a candidate in the election. It clarified this position during an extraordinary session of the Latin American Group, and the decision was communicated to the General Assembly through the group's chairman prior to the eleventh round of voting.

Result
Voting was conducted on separate ballots for the three regional groups.

African and Asian States

Source:

Western European and Others Group

Source:

Latin American and Caribbean Group
The election of one election of one Latin American or Caribbean state took several days to resolve.

Day 1
The first three rounds of voting took place during the 41st and 42nd plenary meetings of the General Assembly.

Day 2
The fourth through eighth rounds of voting were held during the 43rd plenary meeting of the General Assembly.

Day 3
The ninth and tenth rounds of voting were held during the 47th plenary meeting of the General Assembly.

Day 4
The eleventh through thirteenth rounds of voting were held during the 51st plenary session.

Day 5
The fifteenth through twenty-second rounds of voting were held during the 57th plenary meeting of the General Assembly.

Day 6
The twenty-third and final round of voting was held during the 61st plenary session of the General Assembly.

See also
List of members of the United Nations Security Council
Japan and the United Nations

References

External links
UN Document A/59/881 Note Verbale from the Permanent Mission of Costa Rica containing a record of Security Council elections up to 2004

1980 elections
1980
Non-partisan elections
1980 in international relations